Sadikur Rahman (born 18 November 1992) is a Bangladeshi cricketer. He made his first-class debut for Chittagong Division in the 2017–18 National Cricket League on 6 October 2017. He made his List A debut for Khelaghar Samaj Kallyan Samity in the 2017–18 Dhaka Premier Division Cricket League on 5 February 2018.

He was the leading run-scorer for Chittagong Division in the 2018–19 National Cricket League, with 322 runs in six matches.

He made his Twenty20 debut for Khelaghar Samaj Kallyan Samity in the 2018–19 Dhaka Premier Division Twenty20 Cricket League on 25 February 2019.

References

External links
 

1992 births
Living people
Bangladeshi cricketers
Chittagong Division cricketers
Khelaghar Samaj Kallyan Samity cricketers
Place of birth missing (living people)